The principle of distributivity states that the algebraic distributive law is valid, where both logical conjunction and logical disjunction are distributive over each other so that for any propositions A, B and C the equivalences

and

hold.

The principle of distributivity is valid in classical logic, but both valid and invalid in quantum logic.

The article "Is Logic Empirical?" discusses the case that quantum logic is the correct, empirical logic, on the grounds that the principle of distributivity is inconsistent with a reasonable interpretation of quantum phenomena.

References 

Abstract algebra
Principles
Propositional calculus